Upstairs is the third studio album by the contemporary worship duo Shane & Shane. The album was released on May 18, 2004, by Inpop Records label, and the producers on the effort is Will Hunt and Shane & Shane.

Music and lyrics
Dave Urbanski of CCM Magazine wrote that the release "sports a stellar sound", but has a feel that "is homogeneous, meandering and lyrically simplistic." At Christianity Today, Russ Breimeier wrote that to "some have said The Shanes are popular because they've found a way to express God's Word simply, yet effectively. There's truth to that, but don't discount their often overlooked musicianship and production, which helps elevate The Shanes' music from basic folk pop to worship music that is powerful, captivating, and intelligent." Cross Rhythms' Tom Lennie noted how "the lyrics are profound and intimate, the music creative, with interesting, varied percussion overlaid with deft guitar (and a touch of banjo/accordion in places) all topped with this duo's intense, yearning vocals." Josh Taylor of Jesus Freak Hideout evoked that "it seems the entire disc is aiming to please the fans that did not start listening because of the 'catchy pop' side of them."

Reception

Critical

Upstairs has received generally positive reviews from the music critics. At Christianity Today, Russ Breimeier told that "Upstairs is not 'for fans only,' and is much better than one is led to believe." Tom Lennie of Cross Rhythms stated that "all in all, this has got to be one of the most original and beautiful acoustic worship sounds I've heard", which he wrote that "it's thumbs up all the way." Jesus Freak Hideout's Josh Taylor found this to be the duos' "least accessible disc to date", yet he called the effort a "brilliant album lyrically and will appeal to their folk fans most of all." At CCM Magazine, Dave Urbanski told that the album feels "off-the-cuff".

Commercial
For the week of May 29, 2004 music charts by Billboard, Upstairs was on the breaking and entering chart selling at No. 25 on the Heatseekers Albums, and it was on the genre charting Christian Albums in the No. 11 slot. It also charted on the Top Internet Albums chart at No. 297.

Track listing

Charts

References

2004 albums
Inpop Records albums
Shane & Shane albums